Syzygium ridleyi is a species of plant in the family Myrtaceae. It is found in Malaysia, Singapore, and Thailand.

References

ridleyi
Taxonomy articles created by Polbot
Taxobox binomials not recognized by IUCN